= Qarghiliq =

- Neighborhood in Kashgar

Qarghiliq is a neighborhood in Kashgar, in the Xinjiang Uyghur Autonomous Region of China.
